Johnnie Dixon may refer to:
 Johnnie Dixon (defensive back) (born 1988), American former defensive back
 Johnnie Dixon (wide receiver), (born 1994), American wide receiver